Nikolai Anisimovich Shchelokov ( – 13 December 1984) was a Soviet statesman and army general who served sixteen years as minister of internal affairs from 17 September 1966 to 17 December 1982. He was fired from all posts on corruption charges and committed suicide on 13 December 1984.

Early life and education
Shchelokov was born in Almazna, a large Cossack village near Luhansk in Donbas region of Russian Empire, on 26 November 1910.

His father was a mine worker, and Shchelokov himself began working in the mines when he was fifteen years old. He attended Dzerzhinsky Metallurgical Institute and received a bachelor's degree in metallurgical engineering in 1933.

Career

Communist Party
Shchelokov joined the Communist Party of the Soviet Union in 1931. In 1938, he was appointed first secretary of its committee in the Krasnogvardeysky district of Dnipropetrovsk. From 1939 to 1941 he was the chairman of the Dnipropetrovsk City Soviet under Leonid Brezhnev who was the first secretary of the Dnipropetrovsk Oblast. Since then, Brezhnev and Shchelokov forged very strong ties and continued supporting each other in their political careers until Brezhnev's death.

World War II
At the start of World War II, Shchelokov was promoted to the rank of commissar in the Red Army while remaining the chairman of the City Soviet of Dnipropetrovsk. He served as a political commissar in the army from 1941 to 1946.

Brezhnev's clan
After the war, Shchelokov resumed to work as a politician in Ukraine from 1947 to 1951. He was part of the Dnipropetrovsk Mafia, consisting of several allies to Brezhnev, including Andrei Kirilenko and Volodymyr Shcherbytsky, when Brezhnev was head of the Dnipropetrovsk Oblast party committee, or obkom. Following the appointment of Brezhnev as the first secretary of the Communist Party of Moldavia, Shchelokov followed him, becoming second secretary and Brezhnev's de facto deputy in 1951, and he was also named first deputy premier of the Moldavian Soviet Socialist Republic. In the same period, he became a member in the Supreme Soviet.

Chief of the Soviet Police (1966-1982)
Shchelokov was appointed by Brezhnev as minister of public order on 17 September 1966. On 25 November 1968, the Ministry of Public Order (MOOP) was renamed as Ministry of Internal Affairs (MVD) with the title of Shchelokov's office renamed accordingly. He was promoted to the rank of general on 12 September 1976, while serving as interior minister. He was also the Soviet Union's top police officer. One of Shchelokov's deputies at the ministry was Brezhnev's son-in-law, Yuri Churbanov.

Downfall
Five weeks after the death of Brezhnev, on 17 December 1982, Shchelokov was replaced as interior minister by KGB chairman Vitaly Fedorchuk, a measure seen as influenced by Yuri Andropov, Fedorchuk's predecessor as head of the KGB and newly-elected general secretary of the Communist Party as well as an opponent of the Dnipropetrovsk Mafia. Shchelokov's dismissal was due to corruption charges against him.

After leaving office, Shchelokov began work as chief of a police unit at a gas pipeline construction site in Siberia. On 15 June 1983, he was dismissed from the central committee of the Communist Party on allegations of corruption during his tenure, as part of Andropov's anti-corruption campaign. His son Igor was also removed from his post in the Komsomol shortly after. Later reports argued that his wife and son had also been involved in illegal acts of selling and buying foreign cars. It was further argued that Shchelokov spent huge amounts of state money to buy luxury items for personal use. On 6 November 1984, his military rank of army general was withdrawn by the state, and on 7 December he was expelled from the Communist Party. In 1988, author Raul M. Mir-Haidarov argued that Shchelokov had been the godfather of the Uzbek mob.

Death
Shchelokov committed suicide by gunshot to his head using his own hunting rifle from his collection of rarities at his suburban mansion in Moscow on 13 December 1984. He was buried on 15 December in Vagankovo cemetery in Moscow. His wife Svetlana predeceased him having committed suicide on 19 February 1983.

Honours and awards
Shchelokov was awarded the followings: the Order of Lenin (three times), the Order of the Red Banner (twice), the Order of Bogdan Khmelnitsky (Second Class), the Order of the Patriotic War (First Class), the Order of the Red Banner of Labour, the Order of the Red Star, Hero of Socialist Labour and various medals.

He was stripped of all civilian awards and honors on 12 December 1984.

Soviet

 Badge "Honored Worker of the Ministry of Internal Affairs"

Foreign

Notes

References

External links

20th-century Russian engineers
1910 births
1984 deaths
People from Luhansk Oblast
Soviet Cossacks
Soviet engineers
Soviet Ministers of Internal Affairs
Communist Party of the Soviet Union members
Soviet politicians who committed suicide
Recipients of the Order of Lenin
Recipients of the Order of the Red Banner
Suicides by firearm in the Soviet Union
Burials at Vagankovo Cemetery
Members of the Supreme Soviet of Russia
People from Bakhmutsky Uyezd
People from Yekaterinoslav Governorate
Heroes of Socialist Labour
Recipients of the Order of Bogdan Khmelnitsky (Soviet Union), 2nd class
Recipients of the Order of the Red Banner of Labour
Recipients of the Order of the Red Star
Recipients of the Medal "For Courage" (Russia)
Recipients of the Medal "For Distinction in Guarding the State Border of the USSR"
Recipients of the Military Order of the White Lion
Recipients of the Czechoslovak War Cross
Recipients of the Patriotic Order of Merit in gold
Recipients of the Cross of Valour (Poland)
Commanders with Star of the Order of Polonia Restituta
Expelled members of the Communist Party of the Soviet Union
Tenth convocation members of the Supreme Soviet of the Soviet Union
Ninth convocation members of the Supreme Soviet of the Soviet Union
Eighth convocation members of the Supreme Soviet of the Soviet Union
Seventh convocation members of the Supreme Soviet of the Soviet Union
Sixth convocation members of the Supreme Soviet of the Soviet Union
Fourth convocation members of the Supreme Soviet of the Soviet Union
National Metallurgical Academy of Ukraine alumni